KCGB-FM (105.5 FM) is a radio station licensed to serve Hood River, Oregon, United States.  The station is owned by Bicoastal Media and the broadcast license is held by Bicoastal Media Licenses IV, LLC.  The radio studios of KCGB-FM and sister station KIHR are located at 1190 22nd Street in Hood River.

KCGB-FM broadcasts a hot adult contemporary music format branded as "Your Music, Your Station" and programmed by Westwood One.  The station was assigned the KCGB-FM call sign by the Federal Communications Commission (FCC) on March 15, 1982.

Translators
KCGB-FM programming is also carried on a broadcast translator station to extend or improve the coverage area of the station.

References

External links
KCGB-FM official website

CGB-FM
Hot adult contemporary radio stations in the United States
Hood River, Oregon
1978 establishments in Oregon